Ławice  (German Hansdorf) is a village in the administrative district of Gmina Iława, within Iława County, Warmian-Masurian Voivodeship, in northern Poland.

Notable residents
 Emil Adolf von Behring (1854–1917), Nobel laureat

References

Villages in Iława County